The Fraternal Order of Eagles Building is a historic Fraternal Order of Eagles clubhouse located in Richmond, Virginia.  It was built in 1914, and is a three-story, three bay by six bay, rectangular brick building in the Neoclassical Revival style. In 2005, the building was renovated into apartments with a commercial space in the basement.

It was listed on the National Register of Historic Places in 2006.

References

National Register of Historic Places in Richmond, Virginia
Neoclassical architecture in Virginia
Buildings and structures completed in 1914
Fraternal Order of Eagles buildings
Clubhouses on the National Register of Historic Places in Virginia